Thicker Than Blood is a 1998 American made for TV drama film directed by Richard Pearce and starring  Mickey Rourke, Dan Futterman and Carlo Alban. It won an ALMA Award for Outstanding Made-for-Television Movie or Mini-Series in 1999.

Synopsis 
Griffin Byrne is a newly assigned teacher to a Catholic high school in an inner-city near slum neighbourhood of New York, which is run down by headmaster Father Frank Larkin. There, he meets and tries to help Lee Cortez, a smart boy from a poor and troubled family. Lee has a good heart and artistic skills, but is constantly dragged down by his social environment and about to leave the school. Byrne's struggle to help Lee reflects the struggles and difficulties which the school is being subjected to every day.

Cast 
 Dan Futterman as Griffin Byrne
 Mickey Rourke as Father Frank Larkin
 Carlo Alban as Lee Cortez
 Lauren Vélez as Camilla Lopez 
 Josh Mostel as Kendall
 Peter Maloney as James
 Vincent Laresca as Tyro
 Rosanna DeSoto as Señora
 Dick Latessa as Ciccilone
 Grace Garland as Hooker 
 Brandon Segarra as Alberto 
 Frances Conroy as Mrs. Byrne
 Steve Ryan as Mr. Byrne

References

External links 
 
 Thicker Than Blood at TCM

1998 drama films
Films directed by Richard Pearce
TNT Network original films
American drama television films
1990s American films
1998 television films